is a 2011 Japanese martial arts film directed by Yoshikatsu Kimura starring Rina Takeda.

Plot
Rina Takeda and Hina Tobimatsu co-star as sisters Ayaka and Natsuki Kurenai, the youngest descendants of a legendary Okinawan karate master named Shoujirou Kurenai. As children, they live a happy life with their father (Tatsuya Naka) who encourages them to practice karate. However, one day a mysterious group invades his dojo - killing his father, kidnapping Natsuki and stealing the black belt that was worn on his family for more than 200 years. Several years later, Ayaka is living the humble life as an ordinary high school student in Yokohama. One day, when Ayaka was working, a group of assailants were stealing a woman's purse. Ayaka uses her karate skills to stop them from making her a hero to the public. Ayaka's heroism was filmed causing the evil organization to notice Ayaka's fighting skills. Natsuki, on the other hand, was trained as a killing machine by the mysterious group that kidnapped her all those years ago. Soon, Natsuki and the group begin to target Ayaka. Out of love for her sister and with her father's teachings still in her heart, Ayaka decides to do whatever it takes to get Natsuki and her family's black belt back from the clutches of the mysterious group.

Cast
 Rina Takeda as Ayaka Kurenai / Ayaka Ikegami
 Hina Tobimatsu as Natsuki Kurenai / Sakura, her younger sister
 Tatsuya Naka as Tatsuya Kurenai, their father
 Kazutoshi Yokoyama as Ryuji Muto
 Richard William Heselton as Keith
 Noriko Iriyama as Miki Ikegami, Ayaka's adoptive mother
 Saori Takizawa as Reiko Ōhashi
 Keisuke Horibe as Amane Tagawa.

Reception
The movie received critical acclaim.

References

External links
  
 

2011 films
2011 martial arts films
2010s Japanese films
2010s Japanese-language films
Japanese films about revenge
Japanese martial arts films
Fictional karateka
Films set in Yokohama
Karate films
Toei Company films